The year 1640 in science and technology involved some significant events.

Botany
 John Parkinson publishes Theatrum Botanicum:The Theater of Plants, or, An Herbal of a Large Extent.

Mathematics
 The 16-year-old Blaise Pascal demonstrates the properties of the hexagrammum mysticum in his Essai pour les coniques which he sends to Mersenne.
 October 18 – Fermat states his "little theorem" in a letter to Frénicle de Bessy: if p is a prime number, then for any integer a, a p − a will be divisible by p.
 December 25 – Fermat claims a proof of the theorem on sums of two squares in a letter to Mersenne ("Fermat's Christmas Theorem"): an odd prime p is expressible as the sum of two squares.

Technology
 The micrometer is developed.
 A form of bayonet is invented; in later years it will gradually replace the pike.
 The reticle telescope is developed and initiates the birth of sharpshooting.

Births
 April 1 – Georg Mohr, Danish mathematician (died 1697)
 December 13 (bapt.) – Robert Plot, English naturalist and chemist (died 1696)
 Elias Tillandz, Swedish physician and botanist in Finland (died 1693)

Deaths
 December 22 – Jean de Beaugrand, French mathematician (born c. 1584)

References

 
17th century in science
1640s in science